Daniel Fredheim Holm (born 30 July 1985) is a Norwegian footballer who plays as a midfielder and works as an assistant coach for KFUM in the OBOS-ligaen. He is the half-brother of former Vålerenga colleague Thomas Holm, and the son of former footballer Paal Fredheim.

Club
Fredheim Holm was transferred from Skeid to Vålerenga in the spring of 2004, for NOK 1,5 million. In his first season in the Norwegian top division, he scored five goals. He was also one of the Cup Final heroes, alongside "Moa", when Vålerenga defeated Stabæk in the 2008 final, to become Norwegian champions.

On 9 July 2009, it was announced that Fredheim Holm would leave Vålerenga for Danish side Aalborg.

On 20 January 2011, Fredheim Holm was sold to Rosenborg BK.

On 4 February 2013, Fredheim Holm signed a three-year contract with Vålerenga. He won Tippeligaen 2005 with the Oslo club.

Holm signed with KFUM on 28 November 2018, where he became a playing assistant coach.

International career
He received his first call up in March 2007 against Bosnia and Herzegovina and Turkey, and played in the match against Turkey.

Career statistics

References

External links

1985 births
Living people
Footballers from Oslo
Association football midfielders
Norwegian footballers
Norway international footballers
Norway under-21 international footballers
Norway youth international footballers
Skeid Fotball players
Vålerenga Fotball players
KFUM-Kameratene Oslo players
AaB Fodbold players
Rosenborg BK players
Norwegian First Division players
Eliteserien players
Danish Superliga players
Norwegian Second Division players
Norwegian expatriate footballers
Expatriate men's footballers in Denmark